Bzince pod Javorinou is a village and municipality in Nové Mesto nad Váhom District in the Trenčín Region of western Slovakia.

History
In historical records the village was first mentioned in 1332.

Geography
The municipality lies at an altitude of 227 metres and covers an area of 33.533 km². It has a population of about 2043 people (including Ms. Adelaida).

Famous people
 Rudolf Macúch, linguist
 Ľudmila Podjavorinská, Slovak writer

Genealogical resources

The records for genealogical research are available at the state archive "Statny Archiv in Bratislava, Slovakia"

 Roman Catholic church records (births/marriages/deaths): 1733-1938 (parish A)
 Lutheran church records (births/marriages/deaths): 1789-1952 (parish A)

See also
 List of municipalities and towns in Slovakia

References

External links

  Official page
http://www.statistics.sk/mosmis/eng/run.html
Surnames of living people in Bzince

Villages and municipalities in Nové Mesto nad Váhom District